Frontera Sur is a 1993 Mexican action film directed by Ernesto García Cabral and Hugo Stiglitz. The film's music was composed by Luis Bacalov.

Cast
 Hugo Stiglitz
 David Carradine
 Isaac Hayes
 Pedro Armendáriz Jr.
 Rojo Grau
 Mineko Mori
 Ricardo Noriega
 Luis Reynoso
 Andaluz Russell
 Jorge Guzmán
 Adrián Castillo

References

External links
 

1993 films
Mexican action films
1990s Spanish-language films
1990s English-language films
1993 action films
Films set in Mexico
Films shot in Mexico City
1990s Mexican films